Khao Chamao is a district (amphoe) of Rayong province, eastern Thailand.

History
The minor district (king amphoe) was split off from Klaeng district on 31 May 1993.

On 15 May 2007, all 81 minor districts were upgraded to full districts. With publication in the Royal Gazette on 24 August the upgrade became official.

Geography
Neighboring districts are (from the north clockwise) Bo Thong of Chonburi province, Kaeng Hang Maeo of Chanthaburi province, and Klaeng and Wang Chan of Rayong Province.

Administration
The district is divided into four sub-districts (tambons), which are further subdivided into 21 villages (mubans). There are no municipal (thesabans), but there are  four tambon administrative organizations (TAO).

References

Bibliography
 Khao Chamao - Khao Wong National Park(October 27, 2013).Retrieve October 27, 2013, from https://web.archive.org/web/20130911180508/http://www.dnp.go.th/parkreserve/asp/style1/default.asp?npid=108&lg=2 
 Khao Chamao - Khao Wong National Park(October 27, 2013).Retrieve October 27, 2013, from http://www.naturethai.net/National-Park-in-Eastern-Thailand/Khao-Chamao-Khao-Wong-National-Park.html

External links
amphoe.com
Khao Chamao/Khao Wong National Park

Khao Chamao